Plano is a formerly independent settlement east of Žužemberk in southeast Slovenia. It is now part of the village of Dolnji Ajdovec. It belongs to the Municipality of Žužemberk. It is part of the traditional region of Lower Carniola and is now included with the rest of the municipality in the Southeast Slovenia Statistical Region.

Geography
Plano stands on a small hill east of Dolnji Ajdovec. The smaller hamlet of Frata, which has a hiking lodge, lies east of Plano. Gomila Hill rises south of the settlement.

Name
The name Plano has been suggested to refer to the open, level, elevated terrain of the village (cf. planota 'plateau').

History
Plano had a population of 15 (in three houses) in 1900 and 16 (in three houses) in 1931. Plano was annexed by Dolnji Ajdovec in 1953, ending its existence as an independent settlement.

References

External links
Plano on Geopedia

Populated places in the Municipality of Žužemberk
Former settlements in Slovenia